Yacht chartering is the practice of renting, or chartering, a sailboat or motor yacht and travelling to various coastal or island destinations, for business or vacation.

There are two main kinds of charter: bareboat and skippered. Bareboat charters involve a person renting a boat and skippering it themselves. The other way is gathering up a group and renting the yacht with them. Most bareboat companies also offer courses to teach basic seamanship and prepare people for bareboat chartering. These companies also sometimes provide skippered charters, meaning that boat comes with a skipper but no additional crew.

Skippered charter means the yacht comes with a crew. This can be anything from a 35-foot boat with a two-person team serving as captain and chef to a 300-foot boat with a squad of 30 or more crew members including stewardesses, escort, engineers, mates, deckhands, scuba dive masters, water sports instructor and the like.

Types 
Several factors determine the cost of a charter, including the size of the yacht, its age, its pedigree, the number of crew, time of sailing (whether it is high season or not) and the destination. The worldwide range of charter prices (per person per week) is estimated to be from $1000 up to and in excess of $20,000.

The rate for mega yachts or superyachts that are over 150-foot to 300-foot is estimated respectively to be from $45,000 up to $3,000,000 (per week)

Crewed Charter 
Crewed charter means that the yacht is rented with a full crew. Usually, the crew is based on a specific yacht. A captain, a chef, a deck's hand and a hostess are a typical crew. The crewed charter is taxed differently in many destinations from a Skippered charter.

Skippered charter 
Skippered charter means that the yacht is rented with a professional skipper/captain who is responsible for the manoeuvring of the yacht. In several cases, the skipper is also aided by other crew members.

Skippered charter usually is used yachts for which a skipper/captain with documented special nautical skills and experience is required. However, skippered charters exist on all types of yachts.

Cabin charters 
Having become quite popular in the last few years, cabin charters represent the ideal solution to enjoy sailing cruises for those who don’t yet have the skills for a bareboat charter or those who want to board a crewed luxury yacht but can’t justify the cost of acquiring one.

The charter costs regard just a berth aboard the yacht and the provisioning for food and fuel. The cabin can be shared with a friend or even with a travel mate met on board, but the expertise and knowledge of a local skipper are guaranteed, and there is no caution to be paid for possible damages to the yacht. The costs vary a lot: from very little like €500 for a week to more luxury offers starting from €700, where each cabin has its private bathroom, and the crew on board will take on all cooking and cleaning duties. Super yacht charters can cost €125,000–€240,000 per week plus expenses.

See also
Bareboat charter
Luxury yachts
List of motor yachts by length
OCSC Sailing

References

Yachting
Vehicle rental